Biskupice  is a village in the administrative district of Gmina Pobiedziska, within Poznań County, Greater Poland Voivodeship, in west-central Poland.

According to the 2011 census, the village has a population of 1,896.

References

Villages in Poznań County